Allan Manings (March 28, 1924 – May 12, 2010) was an American television producer and comedy writer. He was active in the 1950s, 1960s, 1970s and 1980s and was best known for his work in co-creating with his wife, actress Whitney Blake, One Day at a Time, as well as serving as producer (and later executive producer) of the Bud Yorkin-Norman Lear Tandem show, Good Times.

Manings was born in Newark, New Jersey to a Jewish family, and was raised on Staten Island. He served in the United States Army during World War II in the Pacific theater. After completing his military service, he went to college on the GI Bill as one of the first men to attend the newly coeducational Sarah Lawrence College. Manings felt uneasy during the McCarthyist period, during which time several friends were blacklisted, and moved to Canada until the early 1960s.

He worked as a writer and script supervisor on Rowan & Martin's Laugh-In in the 1960s, for which he received an Emmy. He also wrote episodes of McHale's Navy and Leave It to Beaver.

Writers Guild of America Service
Manings was elected vice president of the Writers Guild of America, West from 1975 to 1977 and also served as a member of its board of directors from 1977 to 1982 and again from 1985 to 1992. He ran unsuccessfully for president of the Guild in 1991 and was a recipient of the Morgan Cox Award for service to the Guild, which he received in 1997.

Personal life
Manings was married to actress/producer Whitney Blake (1926–2002), best known for her role co-starring in the 1960s sitcom Hazel, and the stepfather of Blake's daughter, actress Meredith Baxter.

He died on May 12, 2010, aged 86, in Beverly Hills, California of a heart attack in addition to esophageal cancer from which he was suffering and had been receiving medical treatment.

Sources

Notes

External links

 

1924 births
2010 deaths
20th-century American Jews
United States Army personnel of World War II
Television producers from New York City
American television writers
American male television writers
Deaths from cancer in California
Deaths from esophageal cancer
Emmy Award winners
Writers from Newark, New Jersey
People from Staten Island
Sarah Lawrence College alumni
Screenwriters from New York (state)
Screenwriters from New Jersey
21st-century American Jews